Hata Station is the name of two train stations in Japan:

 Hata Station (Nagano) (波田駅)
 Hata Station (Hyōgo) (葉多駅)